Richard Delmont Wolf (August 29, 1900 – June 28, 1967) was a professional American football player in the early National Football League. He first played at the college level for Miami University. Wolf then played in the NFL with the Cleveland Indians and the Cleveland Bulldogs. He also played in the 1926 American Football League for the Cleveland Panthers. Wolf then finished his career in the semi-pro circuit with the independent Ashland Armcos in 1928-1929.

References

External links
 

1900 births
1967 deaths
American football ends
American football fullbacks
American football halfbacks
American football quarterbacks
Cleveland Bulldogs players
Cleveland Indians (NFL 1923) players
Cleveland Panthers players
Miami RedHawks football players
Players of American football from Ohio